Subbotnik and voskresnik (from  for "Saturday" and ,  for "Sunday") were days of volunteer unpaid work on weekends after the October Revolution, though the word itself is derived from  (Subbota for Saturday) and the common Russian suffix  (-nik).

The tradition is continued in modern Russia and some other former Soviet Republics. Subbotniks are mostly organized for cleaning the streets of garbage, fixing public amenities, collecting recyclable material, and other community services.

The first mass subbotnik was held on April 12, 1919, at the Moscow-Sortirovochnaya railway depot of the Moscow-Kazan Railway upon the initiative of local Bolsheviks. It was stated in the Resolution of the General Council of Communists of the Subraion of the Moscow-Kazan Railway and Their Adherents that "the communists and their supporters again must spur themselves on and extract from their time off still another hour of work, i.e. they must increase their working day by an hour, add it up and on Saturday devote six hours at a stretch to physical labour, thereby producing immediately a real value. Considering that communists should not spare their health and lives for the victory of the revolution, the work is conducted without pay." This subbotnik prompted Lenin to write the article , where he called subbotniks "the actual beginnings of the communism".

On April 12, 1969, to celebrate the 50th anniversary of the first Subbotnik, the Soviet Union revived the concept and millions of citizens volunteered for extra work at least as late as 1971.

The first all-Russian subbotnik was held on May 1, 1920, and Vladimir Lenin participated in removing building rubble in the Moscow Kremlin, an episode portrayed in a famous painting by Vladimir Krikhatsky, Lenin at the First Subbotnik, of Lenin carrying a log.

Subsequently, "communist subbotniks" and "voskresniks" became obligatory political events in the Soviet Union, with annual  "Lenin's Subbotnik" being held in the vicinity of Lenin's birthday.

Subbotnik was also promoted in the 1950s in the Eastern Bloc countries and in particular in the German Democratic Republic (GDR), as the USSR sought to build up the GDR as the westernmost outpost of socialism in Europe.

In Czechoslovakia, a similar kind of work was known as Action Z, from Czech word , "improvement", referring to the typical activities from garbage removal to housing construction.

See also
Civil conscription
Working Saturday

References

Bibliography

External links

Lenin's article about subbotniks
Modern Subbotniks have been performed, on at least one occasion by immigrants from the Former Soviet Union.



Volunteering in the Soviet Union
Saturday events